A hydraulic fluid or hydraulic liquid is the medium by which power is transferred in hydraulic machinery. Common hydraulic fluids are based on mineral oil or water. Examples of equipment that might use hydraulic fluids are excavators and backhoes, hydraulic brakes, power steering systems,  automatic transmissions, garbage trucks, aircraft flight control systems, lifts, and industrial machinery.

Hydraulic systems like the ones mentioned above will work most efficiently if the hydraulic fluid used has zero compressibility.

Functions and properties 

The primary function of a hydraulic fluid is to convey power. In use, however, there are other important functions of hydraulic fluid such as protection of the hydraulic machine components. The table below lists the major functions of a hydraulic fluid and the properties of a fluid that affect its ability to perform that function:

Composition

Base stock
The original hydraulics fluid, dating back to the time of ancient Egypt, was water. Beginning in the 1920s, mineral oil began to be used more than water as a base stock due to its inherent lubrication properties and ability to be used at temperatures above the boiling point of water. Today most hydraulic fluids are based on mineral oil base stocks.

Natural oils such as rapeseed are used as base stocks for fluids where biodegradability and renewable sources are considered important.

Other base stocks are used for specialty applications, such as for fire resistance and extreme temperature applications. Some examples include: glycol ethers, organophosphate ester, polyalphaolefin, propylene glycol, and silicone oils.

NaK-77, a eutectic alloy of sodium and potassium, can be used as a hydraulic fluid in high-temperature and high-radiation environments, for temperature ranges of 10 to 1400 °F (-12 to 760 °C). Its bulk modulus at 1000 °F (538 °C) is 310,000 psi (2.14 GPa), higher than of a hydraulic oil at room temperature. Its lubricity is poor, so positive-displacement pumps are unsuitable and centrifugal pumps have to be used. The addition of caesium shifts the useful temperature range to -95 to 1300 °F (−70 to 704 °C). The NaK-77 alloy was tested in hydraulic and fluidic systems for the Supersonic Low Altitude Missile.

Other components
Hydraulic fluids can contain a wide range of chemical compounds, including: oils, butanol, esters (e.g. phthalates, like DEHP, and adipates, like bis(2-ethylhexyl) adipate), polyalkylene glycols (PAG), organophosphate (e.g. tributylphosphate), silicones, alkylated aromatic hydrocarbons, polyalphaolefins (PAO) (e.g. polyisobutenes), corrosion inhibitors (incl acid scavengers), anti-erosion additives, etc.

Biodegradable hydraulic fluids
Environmentally sensitive applications (e.g. farm tractors and marine dredging) may benefit from using biodegradable hydraulic fluids based upon rapeseed vegetable oil when there is the risk of an oil spill from a ruptured oil line. Typically these oils are available as ISO 32, ISO 46, and ISO 68 specification oils. ASTM standards ASTM-D-6006, Guide for Assessing Biodegradability of Hydraulic Fluids and ASTM-D-6046, Standard Classification of Hydraulic Fluids for Environmental Impact are relevant.

Anti-wear hydraulic fluids
Anti-wear (AW) hydraulic oils are made from a petroleum base fluid and commonly contain the anti-wear additive Zinc dialkyldithiophosphate (ZDDP). This additive works to protect the hydraulic pump. They come in multiple viscosity grades that have varying applications. For example, AW 46 hydraulic oils can be used to operate the hydraulic systems in off-road equipment such as dump trucks, excavators, and backhoes, while AW 32 hydraulic oils may be more suitable for colder weather applications like in a snow plow's pump.

Safety 
Because industrial hydraulic systems operate at hundreds to thousands of PSI and temperatures reaching hundreds of degrees Celsius, severe injuries and death can result from component failures and care must always be taken when performing maintenance on hydraulic systems.

Fire resistance is a property available with specialized fluids. Water-glycol and polyol-ester are some of these specialized fluids that contain excellent thermal and hydrolitic properties, which aid in fire resistance.

Uses

Brake fluid 
Brake fluid is a subtype of hydraulic fluid with high boiling point, both when new (specified by the equilibrium boiling point) and after absorption of water vapor (specified by wet boiling point). Under the heat of braking, both free water and water vapor in a braking system can boil into a compressible vapor, resulting in brake failure. Glycol-ether based fluids are hygroscopic, and absorbed moisture will greatly reduce the boiling point over time. Mineral oil and silicone based fluids are not hygroscopic.

Power steering fluid
Power steering fluid is a sub type of hydraulic fluid. Most are mineral oil or silicone based fluids, while some use automatic transmission fluid, made from synthetic base oil.  Automatic transmissions use fluids for their lubrication, cooling and hydraulic properties for viscous couplings.

Use of the wrong type of fluid can lead to failure of the power steering pump.

Aircraft hydraulic systems 
As aircraft performance increased in the mid-20th century, the amount of force required to operate mechanical flight controls became excessive, and hydraulic systems were introduced to reduce pilot effort. The hydraulic actuators are controlled by valves; these in turn are operated directly by input from the aircrew (hydro-mechanical) or by computers obeying control laws (fly by wire).

Hydraulic power is used for other purposes. It can be stored in accumulators to start an auxiliary power unit (APU) for self-starting the aircraft's main engines. Many aircraft equipped with the M61 family of cannon use hydraulic power to drive the gun system, permitting reliable high rates of fire.
 
The hydraulic power itself comes from pumps driven by the engines directly, or by electrically-driven pumps. In modern commercial aircraft these are electrically-driven pumps; should all the engines fail in flight the pilot will deploy a propeller-driven electric generator called a Ram-Air Turbine (RAT) which is concealed under the fuselage. This provides electrical power for the hydraulic pumps and control systems as power is no longer available from the engines. In that system and others, electric pumps can provide both redundancy and the means of operating hydraulic systems without the engines operating, which can be very useful during maintenance.

Specifications
Mineral oil base:
 MIL-PRF-6083: Usable from −54 °C to 135 °C "where corrosion protection is required and a determination has been made that MIL-PRF-46170 (FRH) hydraulic fluid cannot be used. This includes use in recoil mechanisms and hydraulic systems for rotating weapons or aiming devices of tactical and support ordnance equipment, except combat armored vehicles/equipment which require FRH. The hydraulic fluid is also used as a preservative fluid for aircraft hydraulic systems and components where MIL-H-5606 (OHA) or MIL-PRF-87257 is used as an operational fluid."

Synthetic hydrocarbon base:
These synthetic fluids are compatible with mineral-base hydraulic fluids and were developed to address the low flash point draw back of mineral based hydraulic fluids.
 Mil-H-83282: Synthetic hydrocarbon base, higher flashpoint, self-extinguishing, backward compatible to -5606, red color, rated to  degrees.
 Mil-H-87257: A development of -83282 fluid to improve its low temperature viscosity.

Phosphate-ester base:
 US/NATO Military specification - MIL-H-8446
 Boeing Seattle - BMS3-11
 Boeing Long Beach - DMS2014
 Boeing Long Island - CDS5478
 Lockheed - LAC C-34-1224
 Airbus Industrie - NSA307110
 British Aerospace - BAC M.333.B
 Bombardier - BAMS 564-003
 SAE - Ac974
 SAE - AS1241
 Skydrol

Contamination
Special, stringent care is required when handling aircraft hydraulic fluid as it is critical to flight safety that it stay free from contamination. It is also necessary to strictly adhere to authorized references when servicing or repairing any aircraft system. Samples from aircraft hydraulic systems are taken during heavy aircraft maintenance checks (primarily C and D checks) to check contamination.

Military Spec 1246C is one fluid contamination specification.

The ISO fluid contamination scale assigns a contamination category based on particle size count and distribution.

Other uses
The properties of HLP 32 hydraulic oil make it ideal for lubricating machine tools.

See also 

 Dexron
 Hydraulic brake
 Hydraulic fuse
 Hydraulics International, INC.
 Hydropneumatic suspension - automobile application
 Oleo strut - aircraft application
 Osmosis
 Skydrol

References

External links 

 Information and purchase of military specification (mil-spec) hydraulic fluid
 Information about Fluid Power is also available on the National Fluid Power Association web-site nfpa.com
 USDA Research. Biodegradable Plant-Based Hydraulic Fluid
 Biodegradable Hydraulic Oils
 Industrial Hydraulic Oils
 Aviation hydraulic fluids

Fluid dynamics
Gear oils
Hydraulics
 
Oil Hydraulic Systems